Hŭngnam is a district of Hamhung, the second largest city in North Korea. It is a port city on the eastern coast on the Sea of Japan. It is only  from the slightly inland city of Hamhung. In 2005 it became a ward of Hamhung.

History

The port at Hŭngnam was the site of the Hŭngnam evacuation, a major evacuation of both United Nations military and North Korean civilians during the Korean War in late December 1950. Approximately 100,000 troops and material and 100,000 civilians were loaded onto a variety of merchant ships and military transports totaling 193 shiploads over the weeks leading up to Christmas 1950, and were transported to safety in Pusan and other destinations in South Korea. The evacuation included 14,000 refugees who were transported on one ship, the SS Meredith Victory - the largest evacuation from land by a single ship. This was made possible by a declaration of national emergency by President Truman issued on 16 December 1950 with Presidential Proclamation No. 2914, 3 C.F.R. 99 (1953). This operation was the culmination of the Battle of Chosin Reservoir, in which the embattled UN troops fought their way out of a Chinese trap.

In late 2005, Hŭngnam was demoted from Hŭngnam-si (Hŭngnam City) to Hŭngnam-kuyok (Hŭngnam District) within Hamhung-si.

Population
The population has been estimated at (variously) 200,000 or 450,000; the official North Korean population figure is 700,000 but this is disputed.

Economy

The city is home to the Hungnam Fertilizer Complex, which has allegedly also been used to manufacture chemical weapons. Other industrial facilities include the February 8 Vinylon Factory Complex which allegedly is producing UDMH fuel used for liquid fueled rocket and missiles. It is also home to Hungnam Chemical Engineering College.

Transport
Hungnam Station is on the Pyongra Line railway.

Administrative divisions
Hŭngnam is divided into 43 tong (neighbourhoods), 1 rodongjagu (workers' district) and 5 ri (villages):

See also
Hungnam evacuation
List of cities in North Korea
Geography of North Korea

References

External links 

Cities in South Hamgyong